Remberto G. Sotto (born February 4, 1949) is a Filipino politician in the Philippines who is the current vice mayor of Alicia, Zamboanga Sibugay. Prior to his vice mayoral term, he had also served as mayor of Alicia, Zamboanga Sibugay from 1996 to 2007.

References

1949 births
Living people
Politicians from Zamboanga Sibugay
Southwestern University alumni